The Hall–Hogan Grocery Store is a historic building at 1364 Mitchell Street in Conway, Arkansas.  Originally built as a small retail store, it now serves as a private residence.  It is a single-story gable-roofed structure, built out of stone with cream-colored trim.  The stone, local fieldstone, is laid in a herringbone pattern that is, along with the brick trim, a signature of Silas Owens, Sr., a locally renowned master mason.  The main facade is five bays wide, with display windows in the outer four bays, and the entrance at the center, sheltered by a gabled porch.

The building was listed on the U.S. National Register of Historic Places in 2013.

See also
National Register of Historic Places listings in Faulkner County, Arkansas

References

Commercial buildings on the National Register of Historic Places in Arkansas
Commercial buildings completed in 1948
Buildings and structures in Conway, Arkansas
National Register of Historic Places in Faulkner County, Arkansas
Grocery store buildings